Velikiy Knyaz Konstantin or Grand Duke Constantine may refer to:

One of several Russian Grand Dukes of the Royal House of Romanov, see Konstantin Romanov (disambiguation)
Fort Grand Duke Constantine (Russia), a fort defending  Kronstadt, Russia

Ships
 
Russian tender Veliky Knyaz Konstantin, a torpedo boat tender of the Russian Navy launched in 1857
Velikiy Knyaz Konstantin, a 120-gun ship of the line of the Russian Black Sea Fleet, launched 1852, which participated in the Battle of Sinop